Celine (formerly spelled Céline, and stylized in all caps) is a French luxury ready-to-wear and leather goods brand owned by the LVMH group since 1996. It was founded in 1945 by Céline Vipiana. Since November 2015, the headquarters are located at 16 rue Vivienne in the 2nd arrondissement of Paris at the Hôtel Colbert de Torcy, which has French Historic Monument classification. Séverine Merle has been the Chief Executive Officer since April 2017.

On January 21, 2018, LVMH announced that Hedi Slimane would take over at Celine as its artistic, creative and image director.

Creation of the brand
In 1945, Céline Vipiana (1915–1997) and her husband, Richard, created one of the first luxury brands in the industry, Céline, a made-to-measure children's shoe business, and opened a first boutique at 52 rue Malte in Paris. The brand was recognised by its logo, the red elephant created by Raymont Peynet.

A new positioning

In 1960, the brand decided to change its positioning by focusing its business on a ready-to-wear fashion brand for women with a sportswear approach. Henceforth, the brand offered a range of leather goods such as bags, loafers, gloves and clothes. Céline Vipiana remained the designer from 1945-1997.

In 1964, the launch of the new fragrance "Vent fou" and the new "American Sulky" collection of accessories gained success. The trench became the chief product of the house. Prompted by the popularity of leather, Céline opened a leather goods factory in Florence.

In 1973, Céline redesigned its logo with the intertwined "C" Sulky canvas, linked to the Arc-de-Triomphe, which appeared as a symbol for Parisians. At that time, Céline began its expansion in the world with the opening of various boutiques in Monte Carlo, Geneva, Hong Kong, Lausanne, Toronto and Beverly Hills.

The brand's founders wished to be part of a charitable association, so, Richard Vipiana established the Céline-Pasteur Prize, a sponsor for the American Hospital of Paris in 1973.

Acquisition by LVMH
In 1987, Bernard Arnault decided to buy into Céline's capital. However, it was only in 1996 that the brand was integrated into the LVMH group for 2.7 billion French francs ($540 million). LVMH propelled the brand to fame with the opening of a boutique at 36 avenue Montaigne in Paris.

Céline's designers 
After Céline Vipiana, Peggy Huynh Kinh, appointed by Bernard Arnault, took over the house's artistic direction in 1988. She modernised the brand and initiated seasonal collections for accessories. American fashion designer Michael Kors was named women's ready-to-wear designer and creative director for Céline in 1997. In 2004, he left the fashion luxury house to focus his career on his own brand.

In 2005, the Italian designer, Roberto Menichetti, was named creative director.

A year later, the Croatian designer, Ivana Omazic, directed the design studio. Omazic was a former consultant for the brand and previously worked with Romeo Gigli, Prada, Jil Sander and Miu Miu. Omazic designed for Céline until 2008, after further disappointments for the brand.

Phoebe Philo: a decade as creative director
On September 4, 2008, the fashion portal Women's Wear Daily announced that Bernard Arnault, president of LVMH, had appointed Phoebe Philo as the new creative director of Céline. Philo's tenure at Céline began in October 2008, and she presented her first ready-to-wear collection for Spring/Summer 2010 at Paris Fashion Week. Pierre-Yves Roussel, chief executive officer of LVMH’s fashion division, said that recruiting Philo was giving her the opportunity to express her vision.
In 2009, Vogue Magazine defined her style as the “cool minimal trend”.

Philo studied at Central Saint Martins School of Art and Design in London. Prior to Céline, Philo held the position of Design Director at Chloé.

In 2010, Philo received the Designer of the Year award from British Fashion Council. In 2011, she was awarded International Designer of the Year by the Council of Fashion Designers of America. Both prizes were awarded for her work at Céline.

In December 2017, Philo announced her departure from Céline after finishing the Fall 2018 collection, which was presented in March of that same year.

Hedi Slimane 
On January 21, 2018, LVMH announced the appointment of Hedi Slimane as Artistic, Creative and Image Director, set to join the house on February 1. He is to direct all Céline collections, extending the brand's offering with the launch of men’s fashion, couture and fragrances. In September 2018, Slimane presented an updated Celine logo on the brand's Instagram account.
Slimane created his retail flagship concept stores in Paris, Tokyo, Shanghai, Los Angeles, Madrid, Milan and London.
Slimane replaced the brand's tradition style with his personal signature "driven by youth culture, indie rock and sulking adolescence."

Marketing

Dakota Johnson was the first celebrity to wear Slimane’s first Celine collection on the red carpet for the Los Angeles premiere of Suspiria.  In 2022, Chris Brown wore a Céline Christmas sweater and matching hat in his video for his song "It's Giving Christmas".

Retail
The brand owns almost 178 stores worldwide and is distributed through a selective network including department stores such as Barneys New York (New York), Bergdorf Goodman (New York), Harrods (London) and Galeries Lafayette (Paris).

References

External links
 
 "The Prodigal Daughter Returns: Phoebe Philo Signs with Celine"—Interview in The New York Times (originally the International Herald Tribune)
 WWDFashion
 Label overview at New York magazine Fashion Shows

Clothing companies of France
Clothing brands
Shoe companies of France
High fashion brands
Leather manufacturers
Eyewear brands of France
Luxury brands
LVMH brands
Bags (fashion)
Companies based in Paris
Clothing companies established in 1945
Design companies established in 1945
French companies established in 1945
1st arrondissement of Paris